Sergiy Sergeyev may refer to:

 Serkan Atasay (born 1970), Ukrainian-born Turkish swimmer
 Sergiy Sergeyev (footballer) (born 1982), Ukrainian footballer